Jackson Livingston "Jack" Cannell (May 30, 1896 – March 21, 1965) was an American football player and coach.  He served as the head coach at Dartmouth for seven non-consecutive years, from 1921 to 1922 and 1929 to 1933. His Dartmouth teams amassed a 39–19–4 record.

Early life
Cannell attended Everett High School in Everett, Massachusetts. While there, he played as a quarterback on the football team. He was a part of the 1914 Everett team that went 13–0 and outscored opponents 600 to 0, which he led to a mythical interscholastic championship. Cannell then attended Dartmouth College, from which he graduated in 1920. He played on the football team and earned varsity letters in 1916 and 1919, the latter of which he served as a captain.

Coaching career
In 1921, Cannell became Dartmouth's head football coach, replacing Clarence Spears. In his first season, Dartmouth posted a 6–2–1 record. After the season, Cannell's players petitioned for his return as head coach after they learned alumni were agitating to have him replaced by former Dartmouth star and Colgate coach Lawrence Bankart. The administration vehemently denied that Bankart was to replace Cannell, and The New York Times wrote the "Bankart rumor springs up every year, but usually with little or no foundation." Bankart had previously declined the position vacated by Spears, and had recommended Cannell for the job.

In 1922, Dartmouth posted a 6–3 record. Cannell was replaced by Jesse Hawley, but remained at Dartmouth as an assistant backfield coach under Hawley. Cannell was promoted back to head coach in 1929 after Hawley relinquished the job due to "business pressure". During the next three years Dartmouth amassed a 19–6–2 record, but posted an 8–8–1 mark over Cannell's last two seasons.

On November 24, 1933, before the season finale, The Lewiston Daily Sun reported that Cannell was "through as head coach of the Dartmouth varsity eleven." Five days later, Cannell resigned his position with a year remaining on his contract. Athletic director Harry R. Heneage stated the administration had not pressured him for his resignation, but without further elaboration. The school's student newspaper wrote, "Dartmouth could not play confident football again next year under Cannell with morale that has been weakened by the anvil chorus of criticism." He was replaced by Army assistant Earl Blaik, selected from an original field of more than 100 candidates, which included Ossie Solem and Gus Dorais.

In 1937, Cannell was hired as an assistant under his former high school coach, Cleo O'Donnell, at Saint Anselm College in Goffstown, New Hampshire.

Head coaching record

References

External links
 

1896 births
1965 deaths
American football quarterbacks
Dartmouth Big Green football coaches
Dartmouth Big Green football players
Saint Anselm Hawks football coaches
Sportspeople from Everett, Massachusetts
Players of American football from Massachusetts